Kevin Hall (born 21 May 1944) is a former Australian rules footballer who played for Carlton in the VFL.

Making his debut in 1963, Hall played mostly as a defender and was at a half back flank in Carlton's 1968 premiership side. He was a premiership player with Carlton again in 1970 and 1972, playing as a fullback and ruck-rover respectively. His last game in the VFL was in the 1973 Grand Final which they lost to Richmond and five years later he was appointed to Carlton's match committee, later joining the Board of Directors.

References

External links

Blueseum profile

1944 births
Australian rules footballers from Victoria (Australia)
Carlton Football Club players
Carlton Football Club Premiership players
West Preston Football Club players
Living people
Three-time VFL/AFL Premiership players